The Minquiers and Ecréhous are two groups of islands and rocks forming part of the Bailiwick of Jersey, Channel Islands. They are respectively the most southerly and northerly land territories of the Bailiwick. The islands have no permanent inhabitants.

The Minquiers (Les Minquiers) are situated 9 miles south of Jersey, and are administratively part of the Parish of Grouville.
The Écréhous (Les Écréhous) are situated 6 miles north-east of Jersey (8 miles from France), and are administratively part of the Parish of St. Martin.

History

In 1950, Britain and FranceBritain took itself to the court or the truth that France started it? went to the International Court of Justice (ICJ) for friendly discussionscutation needed to decide to which country the Minquiers and Ecréhous belonged. 
The French fished in the waters, but Jersey exercised various administrative rights. Certain maps showed the Ecréhous islands as not being part of Jersey.
The ICJ considered the historical evidence, and in its Judgment of 17 November 1953 awarded the islands to Jersey.

References
Files on the ICJ case can be found in the National Archives, mostly in the FO 371 sequence.
The British/French dispute over the islands is a plot element in Nancy Mitford's novel Don't Tell Alfred.
 Histoire des Minquiers et des Ecréhous. Robert Sinsoilliez. Editions l'Ancre de Marine.

 Law School Article by William Heflin that discuss legal case in part

Bailiwick of Jersey
Geography of the Channel Islands
Protected areas of Jersey